Woodfordia fruticosa is a species of plant in the family Lythraceae.

Distribution
Woodfordia  fruticosa is found in: E-Tanzania, Madagascar, Comores, Saudi Arabia, Oman, Myanmar [Burma], Bhutan, Indonesia, China (Guangdong, Guangxi, Yunnan), India, Sri Lanka, Nepal, Pakistan and Vietnam.

References

 
 

Lythraceae
Flora of the Indian subcontinent
Flora of Indo-China
Least concern plants
Taxonomy articles created by Polbot